The Berliner Kurier is a regional, daily tabloid published by the Berliner Verlag GmbH for the Berlin metropolitan area in Germany. The paper was owned by M. DuMont Schauberg. and got sold in September 2019 to Holger Friedrichs.

In January 2015, following the Charlie Hebdo shooting in which the staff of a French satirical magazine were attacked after previously drawing the Islamic prophet Muhammad, the front page of the Berliner Kurier was a cartoon of Muhammad reading Charlie Hebdo in a bath of blood.

During the first quarter of 2010 Berliner Kurier had a circulation of 120,353 copies.

References

External links 
 

1949 establishments in Germany
Daily newspapers published in Germany
German-language newspapers
Newspapers published in Berlin
Newspapers established in 1949